Pembina Pipeline is a Canadian corporation that operates transportation and storage infrastructure delivering oil and natural gas to and from parts of Western Canada (since 2003 storage includes ethylene at 1 location); there is also a natural gas processing business that takes place at the Cutbank Complex.  Western Canada is the source of all the product transported by its systems (which include the Syncrude, Horizon and Cheecham oilsands pipelines).  Some of the pipelines and facilities have short term contracts with oil producers while others are long term.
For 37 years until 1997 when it went public and established itself as a trust, Pembina was a regular privately owned business.  On October 1, 2010 it converted to a corporation from a trust, changing its official name from Pembina Pipeline Income Fund to Pembina Pipeline Corporation.  As of 2016 the company had more than 1260 employees, up from 427 in 2010.  The company's total assets nearly doubled in 2017.

History
The company's roots can be traced back to 1954 when the Pembina Pipeline system was built to serve the Pembina oil field in the region of Drayton Valley, Alberta; Pembina Pipe Line Ltd was incorporated that year on September 24.  For the next 37 years the company remained focussed on delivering oil to Edmonton using the Pembina pipeline.  In 1991 it made its first acquisition, Peace Pipe Line Ltd. five years before it made its second move, buying half of the Bonnie Glen System, a 250 km long network serving oil fields in Alberta.  It wasn't until the 4th quarter of 1997 that Pembina joined the Toronto Stock Exchange, going public with an IPO of over 600 million dollars; at the same time it converted to an income fund (trust).  1997 was also the year Inter Pipeline Fund the leading transporter of oilsands bitumen, was established.  Three years later in 2000 it made its biggest move to date that doubled its size overnight when it took over Federated Pipe Lines Ltd in a $340 million deal from a group headed by Imperial Oil (Pembina needed to use a $420 million credit facility).  After the takeover, Pembina's network in Western Canada was 7000 km long and transported nearly 550,000 b/d of oil and natural gas.

Acquired the Cutbank Complex on June 2, 2009 from Talisman Energy subsidiary Talisman Energy Canada for Cdn$300 million in cash (provided by a credit facility).  On June 24, 2003, it paid $185 million for 50% of an ethylene storage facility in Fort Saskatchewan, Alberta from Pittsburgh-based Nova Chemicals Corp.  The deal ensures that Pembina will not have to cover operating costs or capital expenditures for 20 years but gives main control of it to the other 50% owner, Dow Chemical Canada Inc.  In 2001 the company made two big moves, the first in July when Pembina Corp sold a salt cavern in Hardisty, Alberta to Canadian Crude Separators Inc., The other in November by subsidiary Pembina Pipeline Corp when it acquired 100% of the main Syncrude pipeline by taking over its operator, Alberta Oil Sands Pipeline Ltd. for $225 million; that transaction was instrumental in the company's growth by giving it a number of large customers, among them Imperial Oil, Conoco Oil, Nexen and Petro Canada.

In 2012 Pembina purchased Provident Energy, a Canadian company, for $3.1 billion in stock.  In 2017, it purchased Veresen, a rival energy infrastructure company, for $9.7 billion.  At the time, Veresen was primarily a natural gas transportation company, while Pembina focused on transporting oil and other liquids.

In 2019 Pembina purchased Kinder Morgan Canada Limited, along with a portion of the Cochin pipeline, for $4.35 billion.

Operations

Operations are segmented into 3 parts, 2 of them distinguished by the type of oil they transport (conventional, oil sands & heavy infrastructure) with the other dealing mostly with services related to storage/logistics (manages terminals and hubs) as well as marketing.

Conventional Oil Infrastructure - oversees pipelines in British Columbia and Alberta that transport crude oil and NGL's.
There are 2 main systems, the Alberta System and the BC System.
Alberta System wholly owns and runs 3 systems (all in operation since the 1950s) the largest of which is the Peace System (2009) and owns 50% of another, the Glen System (shared with Keyera Energy) and has a 10% interest in the Wabasca Oil Field System. Equal Energy Ltd is one of many minor producers that use the peace pipeline, Equal's 16 wells near Grand Prairie, Alberta deliver oil to the system.
BC Systems is 100% owned, has been in operation since 1960, encompasses 3 storing facilities.  The crude oil pipelines run in northeastern BC and connect Taylor, Alberta to Kamloops.  The total capacity is half of the smallest Alberta pipeline system (80,000 b/d in May 2009).

Oil Sands and Heavy Oil Infrastructure - manages pipelines (and their associated facilities) used to transport synthetic crude from upgrading facilities.  The division oversees Syncrude, Cheechan and Horizon pipelines, the last 2 relatively new (operating since 2006 and 2008 respectively).  All 3 have long term contracts (over 20 years).  Syncrude represents half of the total design capacity.
Horizon serves Canadian Natural Resources at their most important synthetic oil-producing area (the Horizon project, the contract is for 25 years).

Midstream and Marketing - Pembina's storage/terminal business.  18% of revenue comes from storage and related services not connected with the Cutbank Complex and Ethylene storage.
Cutbank is made up of 3 gas plants (Cutbank, Musreau, Kakwa River, 9 compressor stations and a 300 km long system that gathers and processes natural gas liquids.  Kakwa is 50% owned by Pembina but operated by another company.
Ethylene Storage 50% - is an underground operation, the contract runs until 2023 and is operated by Dow Chemicals.  Dow Chemicals along with Nova Chemicals Corp (the company Pembina bought its interest from in 2003) are the biggest customers.

References

Companies listed on the Toronto Stock Exchange
Oil pipeline companies
Oil companies of Canada
Natural gas companies of Canada
Natural gas pipeline companies
Companies based in Calgary
Non-renewable resource companies established in 1954
Energy companies established in 1954
S&P/TSX 60